is a Japanese professional footballer who plays as a defensive midfielder for Gamba Osaka.

Club statistics
.

References

External links

2001 births
Living people
Japanese footballers
Association football midfielders
J1 League players
J2 League players
Tokyo Verdy players
Gamba Osaka players